The following is a list of notable current and defunct magazines in Poland. In the country, there are also English-language magazines in addition to those published in Polish. 

In terms of frequency, the Polish magazines are mostly weeklies and monthlies. Magazines targeting youth and university students also exist in the country.  As of 2013, women magazines were significant part of the press market in the country. In addition, Poland has a long tradition of architecture magazines. The first architecture magazine, Przegląd Techniczny, was published in Krakow in 1875. The country has also aviation magazines.

The number of magazines was 5,792 in 2001 whereas it increased to 6,261 in 2003. In 2014 the magazine market in the country was described as one of the higher-growth, smaller-scale markets.

A
 Ahiasaf
 Archivolta
 Awedis

B
 Bajtek
 Besida

C
 Charaktery
 CKM
 Claudia

D
 Delta 
 Dialog
 Do Rzeczy
 Droga

F
 Film
 Focus
 Folks-Sztyme
 Forum Mleczarskie

G

 Gazeta Polska
 Głos (1886–1905)
 Głos
 Gość Niedzielny
 Gwiazdka Cieszyńska

H
 Heksis

J
 Jedność

K
 Kaliszer Woch
 Kosmos. Problemy Nauk Biologicznych
 Krytyka Polityczna

M

 Magia i Miecz
 Miasto Kobiet 
 Midrasz
 Mucha

N

 Naj
 Newsweek Polska
 NIE
 Nowe Książki
 Nowe Widnokręgi

O
 Odra

P

 Podróże
 Polityka
 Prosto z mostu
 Przegląd
 Przekrój

R
 Rationalist
 Rycerz Niepokalanej

S

 Science Fiction
 Secret Service
 Sieci
 Sprawy Narodu
 Strategie
 Świerszczyk
 Szpilki
 Sztuka i Naród

T

 Teraz Rock
 Twórczość
 Tygodnik Angora
 Tygodnik Illustrowany
 Tygodnik Powszechny
 Tygodnik Solidarność
 Tylko Rock
 Tzafririm

U
 Uczeń Polski
 Uważam Rze

V
 Vogue Poland

W

 Wanda
Mówią Wieki
Wprost
Wszechświat

Z
 Życie

See also
 List of newspapers in Poland

References

Poland
Magazines